Mik Aoki (born October 7, 1968) is a Japanese American baseball coach and former player. He is the head baseball coach at Morehead State University. Aoki played at Davidson College for coach Jim Stoeckel. Aoki has acted as head coach of the Columbia Lions baseball team, Boston College Eagles baseball team and the Notre Dame Fighting Irish baseball team from 2011 season to 2019.

Early life
Aoki was born in Yokohama, Japan, and raised in Plymouth, Massachusetts.  He attended Milton Academy prior to enrolling at Davidson College.  Aoki earned four varsity letters while starting for three seasons for the Wildcats at catcher, second base, and third base.  He was a prolific hitter and still ranks among career leaders in several offensive categories.  Aoki hit two grand slams in 1988, one of just six Davidson players to hit two in one season.  He played one professional season for HCAW in the Netherlands in 1991.

Coaching career
Aoki began his coaching career as head coach at Manchester Community College in Manchester, Connecticut. After one season, he became an assistant at Ohio, where he stayed for two years and earned a master's degree. He then moved to Dartmouth for four seasons before landing his first Division I head coaching job at Ivy League Columbia. In his five seasons, the Lions were 87–140, including twenty or more wins in each of Aoki's last three seasons. Columbia had not won twenty or more games in a season since 1987.
 On June 8, 2019, Notre Dame announced that they would not renew Aoki's contract for the 2020 season.

On July 3, 2019, Aoki was named the head baseball coach at Morehead State University.

Head coaching record
The below table shows Aoki's yearly records as an NCAA head baseball coach.

References

Baseball people from Yokohama
People from Milton, Massachusetts
Living people
Ohio University alumni
Manchester Cougars baseball coaches
Ohio Bobcats baseball coaches
Dartmouth Big Green baseball coaches
Columbia Lions baseball coaches
Boston College Eagles baseball coaches
Notre Dame Fighting Irish baseball coaches
1968 births
Davidson Wildcats baseball players
Baseball coaches from Massachusetts
Morehead State Eagles baseball coaches
Japanese expatriate baseball players in the Netherlands
HCAW players
American expatriate baseball players in the Netherlands
Japanese emigrants to the United States
American people of Japanese descent
Baseball players from Massachusetts
People from Plymouth, Massachusetts
Milton Academy alumni